Rørstad is a village in the municipality of Sørfold in Nordland county, Norway. The historic Rørstad Church is located in the village, and worship services are held there twice each summer.

The village area was located on a peninsula lying between the Nordfolda and Sørfolda fjords, just east of the uninhabited island, Prestmåsøya.  The site was an important historical location due to the importance of boat transportation.  Since boat transportation gave way to automobile transportation in the 20th century, the village became more remote. There are no road connections to Rørstad, but there are ferry connections from Røsvika in the summer. The permanent residents left the village in the late-1970s, but since then the area has been used for summer Holiday cottages.

References

Sørfold
Villages in Nordland
Villages in Norway (depopulated)